This is a sortable table of the notable geysers, hot springs, and other geothermal features in the geothermal areas of Yellowstone National Park.

External links
Online Database of Yellowstone's Thermal Features this link is broken - goes to a TDS generic search page of Wyoming

 
Geothermal features